The 2018 Marylebone Cricket Club University Matches were a series of cricket matches played between the eighteen County Championship teams and the six Marylebone Cricket Club University teams (MCCU) of England and Wales. The first two rounds of fixtures were classed as first-class matches. Each county side were scheduled to play one fixture against a MCCU side ahead of the start of the 2018 County Championship. All the fixtures in the competition were affected by bad weather, with matches either ending in a draw, due to play not being possible because of rain, or in some cases, abandoned with no play possible across all three days.

Fixtures

Round 1

Round 2

Round 3

References

External links
 Series home at ESPN Cricinfo

Marylebone Cricket Club University Matches
English domestic cricket competitions